Bulukohotenna is a village in Sri Lanka. It is located within Central Province. It is home for many people.

See also
List of towns in Central Province, Sri Lanka

External links

Populated places in Kandy District